Rhynchospora corymbosa, known by the common names of golden beaksedge and matamat, is a member of the sedge family, Cyperaceae. It is a perennial herb, found globally throughout the tropics. It grows up to 2 meters tall in riverbanks, shallow pools, and swamps.

References

External links

corymbosa
Flora of South America
Flora of Central America
Flora of the Caribbean
Flora of Africa
Flora of India
Flora of Southeast Asia
Flora of Oceania
Plants described in 1756
Plants described in 1892
Taxa named by Carl Linnaeus